Lapeyrère may refer to:

People 
 Josée Lapeyrère (1944–2007), French writer and psychoanalyst
 Augustin Boué de Lapeyrère (1852–1924), French admiral and Minister of the Navy 1909–1911
 Jeanne-Thérèse Lapeyrère (1845–1907), French writer, mainly under the pen name Paul Aigremont
 Albert Lapeyrère (1908–1996), French musician, singer and conductor, also known as Fred Adison
 Isaac La Peyrère (1596–1676), French philosopher and theologian

Place Names 

 Antarctica
 Lapeyrère Bay, in the Palmer Archipelago

 Canada (Québec)
 Lac-Lapeyrère, Quebec, unorganized territory in Portneuf, Capitale-Nationale

 France
 Lapeyrère (Haute-Garonne), commune (town) of Haute-Garonne, Midi-Pyrénées